Habari  was a free and open source blog engine written in PHP and currently supports MySQL, SQLite and PostgreSQL for the database backend. It got its name from the Swahili greeting habari, which means "(what's the) news".

The last release was on September 16, 2014. The Habari website is no longer working, but the source code is still available on the project's GitHub page.

Features
 Modular, object-oriented core for easy extensibility
 Supports multiple database backends
 Uses prepared statements throughout to protect against SQL injection attacks
 Media silos to directly access various ways of media storage, like Flickr, or the server's file system
 Atom Publishing Protocol support
 Multiple users (authors) supported
 Multiple sites on one installation supported (such as blog1.example.com and blog2.example.com) (note, however, that Habari does not yet support multiple blogs on one domain such as http://example.com/blog1 and http://example.com/blog2
 Support for static content ("pages")
 Plugin support
 Tag support
 WordPress importer

History
The Habari project was started in October 2006 to develop a modern blogging platform. The focus is on utilizing current technology, such as PHP 5, PHP Data Objects, and object-oriented programming, and the support of modern standards, such as the Atom Publishing Protocol.

The first "developer release" was released on April 3, 2007. Habari 0.2 followed on August 4, version 0.3 on November 5, version 0.4 on February 22, version 0.5 on July 27, 2008, version 0.6 on April 6, 2009, version 0.7 on April 1, 2011, version 0.8 on 13 December 2011, version 0.9 on 20 November 2012, version 0.9.1 on April 3, 2013, version 0.9.2 on September 16, 2014.

Habari was a finalist in the 2008 SourceForge Community Choice Awards in the category of Best New Project.

Release history
This table contains the release history of Habari.

References

External links
 Announcement at chrisjdavis.org
 BloggingPro: Habari, A New Blogging Tool
 Mention by Matt Mullenweg, WordPress head developer
 Smashing Magazine: 10 Weblog Engines Reviewed Honorable Mention

Blog software
Free software programmed in PHP
Free content management systems
Content management systems
Website management